Symmachia is a genus in the butterfly family Riodinidae present only in the Neotropical realm.

This genus is distinguished by a strong bulging-out of the costa of the forewing of the males, this characteristic bulge recedes in but few species, presumably owing to a mimetic transformation. This widening of the forewing is accompanied by a peculiar flight resembling that of Thecla, which becomes very conspicuous in the non-mimetic species, whereas in the mimetic species it is replaced by that of the causal originals to which reference is made in the single species, and which may more correctly be eliminated from the genus. They are more closely allied to the Gricosoma than the non-mimetic species, but we shall here give the precedence to the more typical forms. Many Symmachia are great rarities, and they are extremely peculiar in the shape as well as in the colouring. They fly in the day time, not continuously, and rest beneath leaves.

Species 
Symmachia aconia Hewitson, 1876 present in Brazil
Symmachia accusatrix Westwood, 1851 present in Mexico, Ecuador, Colombia, Brazil and French Guiana
Symmachia almeidai (Zikán, 1946) present in Brazil
Symmachia arcuata Hewitson, 1867 present in Brazil
Symmachia arion (C. & R. Felder, 1865) present in Brazil and Colombia
Symmachia aurigera (Weeks, 1902) present in Colombia
Symmachia basilissa (Bates, 1868) present in Brazil and French Guiana
Symmachia batesi (Staudinger, [1887]) present in Brazil
Symmachia calderoni Hall & Lamas, 2001 present in Peru
Symmachia calligrapha Hewitson, 1867 present in Brazil and French Guiana
Symmachia calliste Hewitson, 1867 present in Brazil, Colombia, Nicaragua and French Guiana
Symmachia elinas (Rebillard, 1958) present in Brazil
Symmachia eraste (Bates, 1868) present in Brazil
Symmachia emeralda Hall & Harvey, 2002 present in Ecuador and French Guiana
Symmachia estellina present in French Guiana
Symmachia exigua (Bates, 1868) present in Brazil
Symmachia falcistriga Stichel, 1910 present in French Guiana, Bolivia and Brazil
Symmachia fassli Hall & Willmott, 1995 present in Ecuador
Symmachia fulvicauda Stichel, 1924 present in Brazil
Symmachia hazelana Hall & Willmott, 1996 present in Ecuador
Symmachia hetaerina Hewitson, 1867 present in Brazil and Peru
Symmachia hippea Herrich-Schäffer, [1853] present in French Guiana, Guyana and Suriname
Symmachia hippodice Godman, 1903 present in Brazil
Symmachia jugurtha Staudinger, [1887] present in Colombia
Symmachia juratrix Westwood, 1851 present in Brazil and French Guiana
Symmachia leena Hewitson, 1870 present in Mexico, Panama, Nicaragua, Colombia, French Guiana and Brazil
Symmachia leopardinum (C. & R. Felder, 1865) present in Brazil and French Guiana
Symmachia maeonius Staudinger, 1888 present in Brazil
Symmachia menetas (Drury, 1782) present in Suriname and Brazil
Symmachia miron Grose-Smith, 1898 present in French Guiana and Ecuador
Symmachia multesima Stichel, 1910 present in Colombia and French Guiana
Symmachia nemesis Le Cerf, 1958 present in Brazil.
Symmachia norina Hewitson, 1867 present in Brazil and French Guiana
Symmachia pardalia Stichel, 1924 present in Peru
Symmachia pardalis Hewitson, 1867 present in Brazil and French Guiana
Symmachia phaedra (Bates, 1868) present in Brazil and Ecuador
Symmachia poirieri Gallard, 2009 present in French Guiana
Symmachia praxilla Westwood, 1851 present in Brazil 
Symmachia probetor (Stoll, [1782]) present in Mexico, Nicaragua, Guatemala, Suriname, Guyana, French Guiana and Brazil
Symmachia rita Staudinger, [1887] synonym of Symmachia norina
Symmachia rosanti present in French Guiana
Symmachia rubrica (Stichel, 1929) present in Colombia and Ecuador
Symmachia rubina Bates, 1866 present in Mexico, Ecuador, Colombia, Bolivia and Brazil
Symmachia sepyra (Hewitson, 1877) present in Ecuador
Symmachia splendida (Salazar & Constantino, 1993) present in Colombia
Symmachia stigmosissima Stichel, 1910 present in Bolivia and French Guiana
Symmachia suevia Hewitson, 1877 present in Ecuador
Symmachia technema Stichel, 1910 present in Suriname, French Guiana and Trinidad and Tobago
Symmachia threissa Hewitson, 1870 present in French Guiana, Colombia and Nicaragua
Symmachia tigrina Hewitson, 1867 present in Brazil and French Guiana
Symmachia titiana Hewitson, 1870 present in Ecuador
Symmachia triangularis (Thieme, 1907) present in Colombia and French Guiana
Symmachia tricolor Hewitson, 1867 present in Mexico, Guatemala, Peru and French Guiana
Symmachia virgatula Stichel, 1910 present in Colombia, Trinidad and Tobago and French Guiana
Symmachia virgaurea Stichel, 1910 present in Colombia
Symmachia xypete (Hewitson, 1870) present in Nicaragua and Panama

Sources 

Symmachia at Markku Savela's website on Lepidoptera

External links 

Symmachia at Butterflies of America

 
Riodinidae of South America
Butterfly genera
Taxa named by Jacob Hübner